Sketches from a Secret War: A Polish Artist's Mission to Liberate Soviet Ukraine is a 2005 book by Timothy Snyder. It focuses on the interwar history of the Second Polish Republic and Soviet Ukraine through the prism of the life of Henryk Józewski. Its conclusions consist partly of new research based on the archives of the Polish military.

References

2005 non-fiction books
History books about Poland
History books about Ukraine
History books about Nazi Germany
History books about the Soviet Union
Eastern Europe
Biographies (books)